Michael N. Pearson (born 1941) is an historian and academic known for his studies on the Indian Ocean. He currently serves as Emeritus Professor at University of New South Wales, Sydney.

Pearson was born in Morrinsville, New Zealand. He studied at University of Auckland and completed his doctoral studies from University of Michigan (1971).

Books 
 The Indian Ocean (2003)
 India and the Indian Ocean (1999) 
 The Swahili Coast, India and Portugal in the Early Modern Era (1998)
 Pious Passengers: the Hajj in Earlier Times (1994).

References

External links 
 University of New South Wales

Historians of India
Living people
Historians of South Asia
People from Morrinsville
1941 births
Date of birth missing (living people)
University of Auckland alumni
University of Michigan alumni
20th-century New Zealand historians
University of New South Wales people
New Zealand emigrants to Australia
21st-century New Zealand historians